The Deerfield Beach Arboretum, also known as the Tree Zoo, is an arboretum and botanical garden located in Deerfield Beach, Florida, United States. It covers 9 acres (3.6 ha). It is owned by the city of Deerfield Beach and managed by The Friends of the Deerfield Beach Arboretum. It contains more than 200 different species of trees and palms from around the world, with more than 50 different species of flowering trees. 

The Arboretum was founded by the then city forester, Zeke Landis, in 1995 with a selection of 22 trees and palms, and has since grown to 325 species (excluding native) of palms, tropical fruit trees, exotic flowering and canopy trees, bamboos, and miscellaneous exotic trees. Arboretum areas currently include: Bamboo, Butterfly garden, Children's Garden, Exotic canopy trees, Flowering trees, Native canopy trees, Orchid Display, Palm trees, Spice and Herb Garden, Tropical fruit trees, and a Wetlands demonstration area.

The plant collection is varied and extensive.  Some of the plants at the arboretum include: 
American Oil Palm -  Elaeis oleifera 
African Oil Palm  -  Elaeis guineensis
African Tulip  -  Spathodea
Baobab
Coral Tree
Guiana Chestnut - Pachira aquatica
Indian Laurel
Jacaranda mimosifolia
Rainbow Eucalyptus
Sausage Tree
Ylang Ylang

The Arboretum is currently maintained by the Friends of the Deerfield Beach Arboretum which hosts a workday every first Saturday of the month (about 3 hours 9am -12 noon followed by a free lunch). There are tours every Friday at 10:00am (also same time on first Saturday of the month). There is a free horticultural presentation on the second Thursday of the month at 7 pm in the Constitution Park building from September to May. The Arboretum is currently open from dawn to dusk and is free.  There is a children's playground on the site. There is a paved trail which as a circle measures a half mile with exercise stations.

See also
 List of botanical gardens in the United States

References

External links 
 Official website

Arboreta in Florida
Botanical gardens in Florida
Deerfield Beach, Florida
Protected areas of Broward County, Florida